The blacksoil toadlet (Uperoleia trachyderma) is a species of frog in the family Myobatrachidae. It is endemic to Australia. Its natural habitats are subtropical or tropical dry lowland grassland, subtropical or tropical seasonally wet or flooded lowland grassland, and intermittent freshwater marshes.

Taxonomy
The species was split in 2014, with the populations in the western part of the range, including all those in Western Australia, being assigned to a new species, the ratcheting toadlet (Uperoleia stridera).

References

Uperoleia
Amphibians of Queensland
Amphibians of the Northern Territory
Taxonomy articles created by Polbot
Amphibians described in 1981
Frogs of Australia